Leucotenes coprosmae is a species of moth of the family Tortricidae. It is found in New Zealand, where it has been recorded from the North and South islands, as well as Stewart Island.

The wingspan is 14–26 mm. The ground colour of the head, thorax, forewings and abdomen is creamy or milky white. There is a short oblique black, chocolate, or dark red bar on the forewing.

The larvae feed on small-leaved Coprosma species. They have a green body with a red dorsal stripe.

References

Moths described in 1988
Archipini
Moths of New Zealand